Futibatinib, sold under the brand name Lytgobi, is a medication used for the treatment of cholangiocarcinoma (bile duct cancer). It is a kinase inhibitor. It is taken by mouth.

Futibatinib was approved for medical use in the United States in September 2022.

Medical uses 
Futibatinib is indicated for the treatment of adults with previously treated, unresectable, locally advanced or metastatic intrahepatic cholangiocarcinoma harboring fibroblast growth factor receptor 2 (FGFR2) gene fusions or other rearrangements.

Names 
Futibatinib is the international nonproprietary name (INN).

References

External links 
 

Antineoplastic drugs
Pyrazolopyrimidines
Methoxy compounds
Amines